Nagambie railway station is located on the Tocumwal line in Victoria, Australia. It serves the town of Nagambie, and it opened on 13 January 1880.

Only a small shelter is provided on the platform, with grain silos and fertiliser sheds located on a single siding west of the platform.
The original station building was destroyed by fire in 1991.

As part of the Regional Rail Revival project to upgrade the Shepparton line, the platform was extended to accommodate VLocity trains. The project was completed by August 2022, and included new lighting, seating, shelter and CCTV, as well an upgraded car park and upgraded paths leading to the station.

Closed station Tabilk was located between Nagambie and Seymour, while Wahring was located between Nagambie and Murchison East.

Platforms and services

Nagambie has one platform. It is serviced by V/Line Shepparton line services.

Platform 1:
 services to Shepparton and Southern Cross

Gallery

References

External links

Victorian Railway Stations gallery

Railway stations in Australia opened in 1880
Regional railway stations in Victoria (Australia)